The  or SWD (translated as Subject Headings Authority File) is a controlled vocabulary index term system used primarily for subject indexing in library catalogs. The SWD is managed by the German National Library (DNB) in cooperation with various library networks.

Scope 
The SWD has about 600,000 descriptors and 700,000 non-descriptors (synonyms and quasi-synonyms) as well as synonymous descriptor chains with references to a descriptor. Its growth rate is about 5.5% per year. About three-quarters of the descriptors refer to individual concepts (language identifier, person, entity, title, ethnography etc.) and a quarter are abstract concepts. Linking using hierarchical (about 115,000) and associative (26,000) relations is not very dense, so the SWD cannot be viewed as a thesaurus (as of mid-2003).

The terms in the SWD are also arranged in a separate classification with nearly 500 classes in 36 main groups.

Structure 
The various terms are placed in a classification scheme and also contain references to sources, related terms, preferred term and to a lesser extent hierarchical links. But the SWD is probably not a complete thesaurus because of the low degree of linkage. In both cases, the user interface of the SWD leaves much room for improvement. Instead of making SWD accessible as a user-friendly navigation tool, it assumes that users are familiar with SWD and its classification scheme and enter the appropriate descriptor in the correct form before running a search. Navigating the system or moving from one concept to another by means of hyperlinks is not possible. The strategy of the German Library to distribute authority records commercially makes the extended use of the SWD difficult, e.g. in other keyword systems.

For the exchange of authority records, there is a separate machine exchange format for libraries called MAB-SWD. The head official of the Southwest German Library Network (SWB) offers online access (OSWD).

See also 
 
 Faceted Application of Subject Terminology (FAST), a simplified syntax of LCSH
 Canadian Subject Headings (CSH)

External links 
 Searching the OSWD
 Information pages of the DNB about the SWD
 Rules for the Keyword Catalogue (RSWK) 3rd edition, Deutsches Bibliotheksinstitut, 1998
 Term paper on the SWD

2012 disestablishments in Germany
Library cataloging and classification
Identifiers
Thesauri